Langtang South is a Local Government Area in Plateau State, Nigeria. Its headquarters are in the town of Mabudi.

It has an area of 838 km and a population of 106,305 at the 2006 census.
 
The postal code of the area is 941.

 Hon. Beni Lar represents the Langtang North and Langtang South constituency in the House of Representatives.

See also
Langtang, town
Langtang North Local Government Area

Langtang South,Nigeria.
   Langtang, Nigeria is
  classified into two main category or segments, and this categories are:
  (1)Langtang North and
  (2)Langtang South.
The entered Langtang north and Langtang South
are well considered to be as one Tribe, known as The Tarok Land.
     The community name
    listed below are some of the Langtang South community that are around the Mabudi Community (The center of Langtang South Lga.
   (1)Telfirm Community,
   (2)Kamkun Community,
   (3)Talgwang "
   (4)Mangwang "
   (5)Sabongida "
   (6)Gamankai  "
   (7)Nagani    "
   (8)Ubang    "
   (9)Gina-Rumbu "
   (10)Dadinkowa "
   (11)Zambang "
and(12)Lashel "etc.

Local Government Areas in Plateau State